Cathrine Elisabeth Zaborowski-Melbye (born 3 August 1971) is a former Norwegian football player who played for the Norway national team.

She played on the Norwegian team that won silver medals at the 1991 FIFA World Cup in China.

She won the Karoline Prize in 1989, being the second winner of the prize after Karoline Krüger in 1988.

Career 
She played most of her career for Asker. She played 68 international matches for Norway and scored 7 goals. With Asker, she won the National Championship in 1990 and 1991 and became series champion with the club in 1988, 1989, 1991, and 1992. She became unofficial world champion in 1988. She became European Champion in 1993, and was also in two European Championship finals in 1989 and 1991. She was a World Cup finalist in 1991, where Norway was defeated 2-1 by the USA.

References

External links

1971 births
Living people
Norwegian women's footballers
1991 FIFA Women's World Cup players
Norway women's international footballers
Norwegian people of Polish descent
Asker Fotball (women) players
Toppserien players
NC State Wolfpack women's soccer players
UEFA Women's Championship-winning players
Women's association football midfielders
Association football midfielders